This is a list of electoral results for the Monash Province in Victorian state elections.

Members for Monash Province

 Beaurepaire resigned in August 1943, re-elected in October 1943

Election results

Elections in the 2000s

Elections in the 1990s

Elections in the 1980s

 Two party preferred vote was estimated.

Elections in the 1970s

 Two party preferred vote was estimated.

 This by-election was caused by the resignation of Lindsay Thompson, who successfully moved to the lower house at the 1970 Malvern state by-election.

Elections in the 1960s

 Two party preferred vote was estimated.

Elections in the 1950s

 Thomas Brennan was elected in 1952 as a member of Labor, then defected to the DLP in 1955.

References

Victoria (Australia) state electoral results by district